Michael Talbot may refer to:

 Michael Talbot (musicologist) (born 1943), British composer, musicologist and author
 Michael Talbot (author) (1953–1992), American author
 Michael Kirk Talbot (born 1969), member of Louisiana House of Representatives
 Mick Talbot, English musician

See also
 John Michael Talbot (born 1954), singer and guitarist
 Michael Talbott (born 1955), American actor